Küplüce can refer to:

 Küplüce, Arıcak
 Küplüce, Bolu
 Küplüce, Şavşat
 Küplüce, Yusufeli